Ariel David López (born 1 July 2000) is an Argentine professional footballer who plays as a forward for Fénix de Pilar, on loan from Chacarita Juniors.

Career
López started out his career with Chacarita Juniors. A goalless draw with Deportivo Morón on 2 February 2019 saw López make his first appearance in professional football, coming off the bench in place of Elías Alderete with five minutes remaining. In January 2022, López joined Fénix de Pilar on a one-year loan deal.

Career statistics
.

References

External links

2000 births
Living people
Footballers from Buenos Aires
Argentine footballers
Association football forwards
Primera Nacional players
Chacarita Juniors footballers
Club Atlético Fénix players